Frederick G. Dale (January 3, 1896 – Marcy 21, 1967) was an American football player and coach and a geography professor.

Playing career
After spending two years at Wayne State College, he continued his college football career at the University of Nebraska. A bruising fullback, he was noted to have beat Rutgers so soundly in a 1920 game at the Polo Grounds, a sports reporter commented, "Not five Rutgers men could stop him."

Coaching career

He served as the head football coach at Wayne State College in Wayne, Nebraska from 1921 to 1927. He also served as the school's head men's basketball coach from 1921 to 1927 and 1944 to 1945.

Academic career
Dale was a geography professor at Wayne State. The school's on-campus planetarium is named in his honor.

Head coaching record

Football

References

External links
 

1896 births
1967 deaths
American football fullbacks
Nebraska Cornhuskers football players
Wayne State Wildcats football coaches
Wayne State Wildcats football players
Wayne State Wildcats men's basketball coaches
Wayne State College faculty